Ekaterina Ulanova (née Kabeshova) (born August 5, 1986) is a Russian volleyball player. She competed for the Russia women's national volleyball team in the 2008 and the 2012 Summer Olympics. She also won the gold medal at the 2014 FIVB Club World Championship, playing with Dinamo Kazan.

Personal and early life
She married the CSKA Moscow football player Ivan Ulanov in 2011.

Career
In 2010, she joined Dinamo Kazan, winning with this team the Russian Superleague in 2011, 2012 and 2013 and two times the Russian Cup, in 2010 and 2012.

Ulanova won with the Russian club Dinamo Kazan the 2013–14 CEV Champions League held in Baku, Azerbaijan, defeating 3-0 the home owners Rabita Baku in the semifinals and 3-0 to the Turkish VakıfBank İstanbul in the final.

Ulanova won the 2014 FIVB Club World Championship gold medal playing with the Russian club Dinamo Kazan that defeated 3-0 the Brazilian Molico Osasco in the championship match. She was also awarded competition's Best Libero.

Clubs
  Olympia Shuja (2003–2004)
  Dinamo Moscow (2004–2006)
  CSKA Moscow 2006–2007)
  Leningradka Saint Petersburg (2007–2009)
  Dynamo Krasnodar (2009–2010)
  Dinamo Kazan (2010–2014)

Awards

Individuals
 2011 Russian Cup "Best Libero"
 2011 Russian Cup "Best Receiver"
 2014 FIVB Club World Championship "Best Libero"

Clubs
 2011 Russian League Championship –   Champion, with Dinamo Kazan
 2011–12 CEV Champions League –  Bronze medal, with Dinamo Kazan
 2012 Russian League Championship –   Champion, with Dinamo Kazan
 2013 Russian League Championship –   Champion, with Dinamo Kazan
 2013–14 CEV Champions League -  Champion, with Dinamo Kazan
 2014 FIVB Club World Championship –  Champion, with Dinamo Kazan
 2016–17 CEV Cup –  Champion, with Dinamo Kazan

References

1986 births
Living people
Russian women's volleyball players
Olympic volleyball players of Russia
Volleyball players at the 2008 Summer Olympics
Volleyball players at the 2012 Summer Olympics
Sportspeople from Ivanovo
20th-century Russian women
21st-century Russian women